The Wickliffe Middle School shooting was a school shooting that occurred on November 7, 1994, at Wickliffe Middle School in Wickliffe, Ohio, United States. The gunman, 37-year-old Keith A. Ledeger, was a former student at Wickliffe Middle School.

Events
Ledeger, armed with a 12-gauge shotgun, entered the school at 2:10pm. He walked into the school's administrative offices, located just off the front entrance, and asked to speak with the principal or assistant principal. Principal James Anderson spotted his weapon and scrambled for cover inside a coworker's office. Ledeger followed Anderson, who had locked himself inside, and fired several shots through the door. Anderson was wounded but managed to escape out an open window, where he was spotted by Wickliffe policeman Thomas Schmidt. Schmidt immediately moved to assist Anderson around the same time three other officers entered the school through the north and east doors.

Ledeger then left the office and walked towards the computer lab, where custodian Peter Christopher, an amateur computer hobbyist, had been assisting a teacher with tech issues. Ledeger pointed his weapon at an 11-year old girl standing next to Christopher, who Christopher then pushed into the lab and stood in front of the door. The custodian implored Ledeger to drop his weapon, but Ledeger refused and shot Pete Christopher twice, killing him instantly. Christopher's sacrifice would later be honored by shopwork students, who crafted a memorial wooden bench with a plaque commemorating Christopher, which to this day features prominently in the middle school's administrative offices.

Ledeger was next seen outside the boys locker room, where shop teacher Lowell Grim was helping students hide. Grimm shoved a student in the locker room then tried to run, but was shot three times. He stumbled out a rear door to the school's recreational yard, where he collapsed. He would survive his injuries.

By this time, Wickliffe police officer Leonard Nosse had entered through the east side of the building. Nosse encountered Ledeger in the hallway outside the boys locker room. A gunbattle ensued, and officer Thomas Schmidt was wounded when he inadvertently came across Ledeger. Ledeger attempted to finish off Schmidt, but was incapacitated by gunfire from Nosse. Nosse was given the Jorge Medina Award for his bravery in stopping the perpetrator from causing further damage.

Ledeger was sentenced to 57 years in prison, and died on December 24, 2011 while serving his sentence.

Ledeger was an alcoholic at the time of the shooting. He was seen walking into the school by a construction crew doing work on a nearby bank. They managed to call 911 before he entered the school which greatly reduced the number of casualties.

See also
List of school shootings in the United States

References

External links
New York Times article
 Short newspaper article
Education Week article (Ledeger was, however, not a disgruntled parent as stated in the article.)
Lake County Crime Lab report

Lake County, Ohio
Murder in Ohio
1994 murders in the United States
1994 mass shootings in the United States
Mass shootings in the United States
Attacks in the United States in 1994
School killings in the United States
1994 in Ohio
Middle school shootings in the United States
Deaths by firearm in Ohio
Crimes in Ohio
November 1994 events in the United States
Mass shootings in Ohio
School shootings in Ohio